Brij Mohan Vyas (Hindi: बृज मोहन व्यास) (1920-2013) was an Indian actor of Bollywood who is best remembered for his role of Ravana in Babubhai Mistri's Sampoorna Ramayana (1961). He was the younger brother of lyricist Bharat Vyas.

Early life
Vyas was born in the Churu district of Rajasthan on 22 October 1920 in pushkarna brahaman family. He remained in Rajasthan until he completed his graduation in Sanskrit, after which he moved to Mumbai, at the behest of his brother.

Filmography
This is selected list of films:-

Personal life
He was married at the age of 17 when his wife, Jamna was just 11. They had 71 years of marital lite before Jamna Vyas died in 2008. They had six daughters and a son. After acting in over 200 films in various languages, Vyas quit acting in the early 1990s.

Death 
He died on 11 March 2013 at the age of 92.

References

External links
 

Indian male film actors
Male actors in Hindi cinema
20th-century Indian male actors
1920 births
2013 deaths